Guillermo Avalos (born 1923) is an Argentine athlete who competed in the 1948 Summer Olympics in the 800m and 4x400m relay, but he failed to advance past the first round in either event.

References
Guillermo Avalos' profile at Sports Reference.com

External links

1923 births
Possibly living people
Athletes (track and field) at the 1948 Summer Olympics
Olympic athletes of Argentina
Argentine male sprinters
Argentine male middle-distance runners
20th-century Argentine people